Isabella of Navarre (1395 – 31 August 1450) was the younger surviving daughter of Charles III of Navarre and his wife Eleanor of Castile. She was a member of the House of Évreux.

Early life and family 
Shortly before Isabella's birth, her mother was dealing with problems in Castile, involving her brother John I of Aragon. Eleanor was forced to return to Navarre for her daughter's birth.

Isabella was the sixth of eight children. Her two younger brothers died in childhood, leaving Isabella and her five older sisters. Her sisters included: Joanna (died before inheriting the throne), Blanche (successor of their father), and Beatrice.

Marriage 
Isabella was firstly betrothed to Infante John of Aragon  around 1414. Her mother, Queen Eleanor bequeathed her money for the marriage. John later became King of Aragon but broke off his contract with Isabella, in hopes of marrying Joanna II of Naples.

Isabella eventually married on 10 May 1419 John IV of Armagnac. This marriage was John's second marriage, after the death of his first wife Blanche of Brittany, who had left no sons.

Isabella and John had five children:
Marie of Armagnac (b. 1420–1473), married in 1437 John II of Alençon (b. 1409–1476), Duke of Alençon; maternal great-grandparents of King Henry IV of France.
John V of Armagnac (b. 1420–1473), Viscount of Lomagne, then Count d' Armagnac, of Fézensac and Rodez. He married illegally to younger sister Isabella, had issue and married secondly to Joan of Foix, also with issue.
Eleanor (b. 1423–1456), married in 1446 Louis de Chalon (b. 1389; † 1463), Prince d'Orange, Lord of Arlay and Arguel, had issue
Charles I (b. 1425–1497), Viscount of Fézensaguet, then Count d' Armagnac, of Fézensac and Rodez
Isabella (b. 1430–1476), Lady of the Four-Valleys, married illegally to brother John and had issue.

Isabella and her husband both died in 1450; she died in August and he died three months later in November, she was around fifty-four at the time of death.

Ancestry

References

Sources

1395 births
1450 deaths
Navarrese infantas
Isabella
14th-century nobility from the Kingdom of Navarre
15th-century nobility from the Kingdom of Navarre
Daughters of kings